Elk Creek Township is a township in Republic County, Kansas, in the United States.

History
Elk Creek Township was organized in 1871, and named from the Elk Creek.

References

Townships in Republic County, Kansas
Townships in Kansas